"I'll Bet She's Got a Boyfriend" is a song by Shanice Wilson.  It was the fourth and final single released from her debut album Discovery. Although released as a single, it was not included on Ultimate Collection. The single had a music video.

Track listing 

12" single USA
A1. "I'll Bet She's Got a Boyfriend" (Miami Mix) (6:01)
B1. "I'll Bet She's Got a Boyfriend" (House Mix) (6:20)
B2. "I'll Bet She's Got a Boyfriend" (LP Version) (4:36)

12" single UK
A1. "I'll Bet She's Got a Boyfriend"** (Urban Mix) (7:20)
B1. "I'll Bet She's Got a Boyfriend"** (Underground Dub Mix) (5:00)
B2. "I'll Bet She's Got a Boyfriend"* (Miami Mix) (6:01)

12" single Canada
A1. "I'll Bet She's Got a Boyfriend" (Miami Mix) (6:01)
A2. "I'll Bet She's Got a Boyfriend" (Miami Edit) (3:45)
B1. "I'll Bet She's Got a Boyfriend" (House Version) (6:20)
B2. "I'll Bet She's Got a Boyfriend" (House Edit) (3:40)

* Remixed by Phil Harding
** Remixed by Phil Harding, Jamie Bromfield, and Rory K

Charts

References

Shanice songs
1988 singles
Songs written by Bryan Loren
1987 songs
A&M Records singles
Freestyle music songs